Benjamin Elliot Blythe (born 13 January 2002) is an English footballer who plays as a defender for  club Swansea City.

Career

Doncaster Rovers
Born in Leeds, Blythe signed his first professional contract with Doncaster Rovers in July 2020. He made his senior debut as a substitute in a 4–1 League One defeat to Peterborough United on 9 May 2021. On 22 September 2021, he was sent out on a one-month loan to National League North side Farlsey Celtic. Following his return from loan, he made his first league start on 7 December 2021 at home to Oxford United, but was substituted at half-time as Doncaster lost 2–1.

Swansea City
In March 2022, it was announced that Blythe would join EFL Championship club Swansea City's under-23 side at the end of the season, having spent a month at the club on trial and that Blythe would continue to train with Swansea until the end of the season. Doncaster manager Gary McSheffrey confirmed that the club would receive a fee and the agreement included add-ons and a sell-on clause.

Career statistics

References

External links

2002 births
Living people
English footballers
Footballers from Leeds
Association football defenders
Doncaster Rovers F.C. players
Farsley Celtic F.C. players
Swansea City A.F.C. players
English Football League players
National League (English football) players